A Regional Red List is a report of the threatened status of species within a certain country or region.  It is based on the IUCN Red List of Threatened Species, an inventory of the conservation status of species on a global scale.  Regional Red Lists assess the risk of extinction to species within a political management unit and therefore may feed directly into national and regional planning.  This project is coordinated by the Zoological Society of London, the World Conservation Union (IUCN) and partners in national governments, universities and organizations throughout the world.

Regional Red Lists may assist countries or regions in:

 Determining the conservation status and trends of species
 Identifying species or ecosystems under greatest threat
 Informing conservation planning and priority setting
 Raising awareness of threatened species

Assessing extinction risk on a regional scale

The IUCN Categories and Criteria were initially designed to assess the conservation status of species globally, however there was a demand for guidelines to apply the system at the regional level.  In 2003, IUCN developed a set of transparent, quantitative criteria to assess the conservation status of species at the regional and national level. This approach is now being applied in many countries throughout the world.

Recently, Regional Red Lists have been completed for Mongolian Mammals and Fishes. These have also been accompanied by Summary Conservation Action Plans, detailing recommended conservation measures for each threatened species.

Creating a Regional Red List

A Regional Red List may be created by any country or organisation by following the clear, repeatable protocol.  The process is as follows:

 All information relevant to a species conservation status is collected, including species distribution, population trend information, habitat, ecology and life history information, threats to the species and conservation measures currently in place. 
 A conservation assessment is made, using the IUCN Regional Categories and Criteria.
 A regional workshop is held in which experts review the assessments, make any corrections necessary and add additional information.
 The assessments are then collated into a Regional Red List document.
 A Summary Conservation Action Plan may also be created.

Towards 2010 targets

Summary of 2006 IUCN Red List categories.
In April 2002 at the Convention on Biological Diversity (CBD), 188 nations committed themselves to actions to “…achieve, by 2010, a significant reduction of the current rate of biodiversity loss at the global, regional and national levels…”.

When a Regional Red List is compiled at regular intervals, it can provide information about how the status of the region's biodiversity is changing over time.  This information may be useful to policy makers, conservationists, and the general public, as it may assist countries in meeting their obligation to the CBD.

Building the Regional Red List Network

Currently, a global network of countries and individuals working on Regional Red Lists is being developed.  This will include a centralised online database where Regional Red List assessments and Action Plans can be stored, managed, and made accessible. With this regional network there will be opportunities to learn from each other's experiences in applying the IUCN Categories and Criteria and in using this information for conservation planning and priority setting.

British reviews of conservation status
Two public bodies in Britain, Natural England and the Joint Nature Conservation Committee (JNCC), have produced British Red Data Books and other reviews of different plants and animals assigning their conservation status according to IUCN Red Data Book criteria. In 2016 the JNCC produced a spreadsheet which incorporated these reviews and lists of threatened species based on other criteria such as Biodiversity Action Plan Priority Lists and Schedules of the Wildlife & Countryside Act.

Natural England uses the following definitions for uncommon species not rare enough to be included in the Red Data Book:
Nationally important site for a species is one which has more than 1% of the British population.
Internationally important site for a species is one which has more than 1% of the north-west European population.
Nationally scarce species are those which occur in 16–100 10 km squares in Great Britain
Nationally rare species are those which occur in 1–15 10 km squares in Great Britain.

See also

Zoological Society of London
Institute of Zoology
World Conservation Union (IUCN)
IUCN Red List
Convention on Biological Diversity
National University of Mongolia

References
Clark, E.L., Munkhbat, J., Dulamtseren, S., Baillie, J.E.M., Batsaikhan, N., Samiya, R. and Stubbe, M. (compilers and editors) (2006a) Mongolian Red List of Mammals. Regional Red List Series Vol. 1. Zoological Society of London, London. (In English and Mongolian). 
Clark, E.L., Munkhbat, J., Dulamtseren, S., Baillie, J.E.M., Batsaikhan, N., King, S.R.B., Samiya, R., Stubbe, M. (compilers and editors) (2006b) Summary Conservation Action Plans for Mongolian Mammals. Regional Red List Series Vol. 2. Zoological Society of London. (In English and Mongolian).
Gärdenfors, U., Hilton-Taylor, C., Mace, G.M., Rodríguez, R.P. 2001. The Application of IUCN Red List Criteria at Regional Levels. 15 (5): 1206–1212.
Greenbaum, E., Komar, O. 2005. Threat assessment and conservation prioritization of the herpetofauna of El Salvador. Biodiversity and Conservation. 14: 2377–2395.
IUCN (2001) IUCN Red List Categories and Criteria: Version 3.1. IUCN Species Survival Commission. IUCN, Gland, Switzerland and Cambridge, UK. ii + 30 pp.En français En español
IUCN (2003) Guidelines for Application of IUCN Red List Criteria at Regional Levels: Version 3.0. IUCN Species Survival Commission. IUCN, Gland, Switzerland and Cambridge, UK. ii + 26 pp.En français En español
Miller, R.M., Rodríguez, J.P., Aniskowicz-Fowler, T., Bambaradeniya, C., Boles, R., Eaton, M.A., Gärdenfors, U., Keller, V., Molur, S., Walker, S., Pollock, C. (2006) Extinction Risk and Conservation Priorities. Science. 313: 441.
Miller, R.M., Rodríguez, J.P., Aniskowicz-Fowler, T., Bambaradeniya, C., Boles, R., Eaton, M.A., Gärdenfors, U., Keller, V., Molur, S., Walker, S., Pollock, C. (2007) National Threatened Species Listing Based on IUCN Criteria and Regional Guidelines: Current Status and Future Perspectives. Conservation Biology. 21 (3): 684–696. 
Ocock, J., Baasanjav, G., Baillie, J. E. M., Erbenebat, M., Kottelat, M., Mendsaikhan, B. and Smith, K. (compilers and editors) (2006). Mongolian Red List of Fishes. Regional Red List Series Vol. 3. Zoological Society of London, London. (In English and Mongolian).
Ocock, J., Baasanjav, G., Baillie, J. E. M., Erbenebat, M., Kottelat, M., Mendsaikhan, B. and Smith, K. (compilers and editors) (2006). Summary Conservation Action Plans for Mongolian Fishes. Regional Red List Series Vol. 4. Zoological Society of London, London. (In English and Mongolian).

Notes

Further reading

Sharrock, S. & Jones, M. (2009) Conserving Europe's threatened plants Botanic Gardens Conservation International (BGCI)  - Red Listing European plants

External links
National Red List website
Zoological Society of London
Institute of Zoology
IUCN Red List
IUCN Red List Database
Convention on Biological Diversity
European Mammal Assessment
National and regional Red Lists at Plantarium web site 
Red List Chelyabiskaya oblast (Russia)

International Union for Conservation of Nature
Biodiversity
Biota by conservation status